Helen Ainsworth (October 10, 1901 – August 18, 1961), also known as Cupid Ainsworth, was a stage and motion picture actress. She went to Hollywood in the 1920s as an agent, and she helped a number of actors attain stardom: Guy Madison, Marilyn Monroe, Rhonda Fleming, Carol Channing and Howard Keel, among others.

Filmography

Actress
 Big News (1929)
 Skinner Steps Out (1929) uncredited
 Dance With Me (1930)
 The Tip-Off (1931)
 No More Bridge! (1934)
 The Big Broadcast of 1937 (1936)
 Gold Mine in the Sky (1938)
 Cafe Society (1939) uncredited
 The Doctor Takes a Wife (1940) uncredited
 You're the One (1941)
 The Lady is Willing (1942) uncredited

Producer
 5 Against the House (1955) (associate producer)
 Zane Grey Theater (1956)
 Reprisal! (1956) (associate producer)
 The 27th Day (1957)
 The Hard Man (1957)
 Bullwhip (1958)

Writer
 Zane Grey Theater (1956)
 Jericho (1961)

External links

References 

1901 births
1961 deaths
American stage actresses
Film producers from California
Burials at Hollywood Forever Cemetery
Actresses from California
20th-century American actresses
American film actresses
Actresses from San Jose, California
20th-century American singers
20th-century American businesspeople
20th-century American businesswomen
American women film producers